Golgotha is the fifteenth studio album by American heavy metal band W.A.S.P. The album was released on October 2, 2015 through Napalm Records, and is W.A.S.P.'s first studio album since Babylon (2009), marking the longest gap between two studio albums in their career. Golgotha is also W.A.S.P.'s last studio album with drummer Mike Dupke, who left the band just prior to its release.

Track listing

Personnel
W.A.S.P.
 Blackie Lawless – lead vocals, guitars, keyboards, producer
 Doug Blair – lead guitars, backing vocals
 Mike Duda – bass
 Michael Dupke – drums

Production
Michael Dupke, Mark Zavon, Jun Murakawa – engineers
Logan Mader – mixing

Charts

References

2015 albums
W.A.S.P. albums
Napalm Records albums
Albums produced by Blackie Lawless